Morino is a comune and town in the Province of L'Aquila in the Abruzzo region of Italy.

Geography 
A town of Abruzzo, Morino is in the center of the Roveto valley, in the Marsica region. The main area is on the slopes of the eastern side of the Hernici Mounts.

See also
Hermitage of Santa Maria del Cauto

References

 
Cities and towns in Abruzzo
Marsica